Deccan Gymkhana Ground is a ground in located in Deccan Gymkhana area of Pune, Maharashtra. The Deccan Gymkhana and its grounds were founded in October 1906. The chief founder was Mr. Balkrishna Narayan ( Bandopant) Bhajekar. The ground has a pavilion and can accommodate 500 persons.   It has basketball and volleyball courts and a cricket ground along with one gymnasium hall. It also has facilities for swimming, table tennis, billiards, cards and 11 tennis courts. It has one main clubhouse.

This sports club has hosted Davis Cup matches. This was also the host of Maharashtra Premier League cricket matches.  This club also host the NECC ITF International Women's Tournament 2011.

References

External links
Cricinfo profile
Cricketarchive.com (1)

Sports venues in Maharashtra
Cricket grounds in Pune
Sports venues in Pune
Cricket grounds in Maharashtra
Multi-purpose stadiums in India
Basketball venues in India
Volleyball venues in India
Tennis venues in India
Sports venues completed in 1908
1908 establishments in India
20th-century architecture in India